Eric George Molyneux Fletcher, Baron Fletcher,  (26 March 1903 – 9 June 1990) was a Labour Party politician in the United Kingdom.

Personal life
Fletcher was the eldest of three children of Clarence George Eugene Fletcher (1875-1929), CBE, of Oak Lodge, Bycullah Road, Enfield, London, a barrister and town clerk of Islington, formerly town clerk of Bethnal Green, and, as a recognized authority on the subject, a member of the Advisory Committee set up by the Home Office on registration of electors and conduct of elections, and Nellie Molyneux, formerly of Tooting. He had a brother, Dr (Clarence) John Molyneux Fletcher (father of the historian Anthony Fletcher), and sister, Ena. His paternal grandfather, George Fletcher, was a member of the Metropolitan Police Force attached to the Fulham Division. He studied at Radley College and the University of London and became a solicitor, specialising in international law. He was deputy chairman of the Associated British Picture Corporation.

Political life
Fletcher was elected onto the London County Council for Islington South, serving 1934–49. At the 1945 general election, he was elected as Member of Parliament (MP) for Islington East, defeating the Conservative Party feminist MP Thelma Cazalet-Keir.  In Harold Wilson's first government, he served from 1964 to 1966 as Minister without Portfolio, House of Commons spokesman for the Lord Chancellor's Department and then Deputy Speaker.

Fletcher was knighted in 1964, and appointed to the Privy Council in 1967. On 9 July 1970, he was created a life peer as Baron Fletcher, of Islington in Greater London.

Other work
Fletcher served as a member of the Church Assembly of the Church of England in 1962. He was a member of the Senate of the University of London, and a governor of Birkbeck College and the London School of Economics.

Fletcher was a member of the Royal Commission on Historical Manuscripts from 1966, a trustee of the British Museum between 1968 and 1977, and president of the British Archaeological Association from 1960 to 1963.

Fletcher was a keen amateur historian of legal matter and archaeology. He was elected a Fellow of the Society of Antiquaries of London (FSA) in 1954, and was also a Fellow of the Royal Historical Society (FRHistS).

Arms

References

Archives
 Catalogue of the Fletcher papers at the Archives Division of the London School of Economics.

External links 
 

1903 births
1990 deaths
20th-century British lawyers
Alumni of the University of London
Deputy Speakers of the British House of Commons
English Anglicans
English solicitors
Fellows of the Society of Antiquaries of London
Labour Party (UK) MPs for English constituencies
Fletcher, Eric Fletcher, Baron
Members of London County Council
Members of the Fabian Society
Ministers in the Wilson governments, 1964–1970
People associated with Birkbeck, University of London
People associated with the London School of Economics
People educated at Radley College
Politics of the London Borough of Islington
Trustees of the British Museum
UK MPs 1945–1950
UK MPs 1950–1951
UK MPs 1951–1955
UK MPs 1955–1959
UK MPs 1959–1964
UK MPs 1964–1966
UK MPs 1966–1970
UK MPs who were granted peerages
20th-century English lawyers
Life peers created by Elizabeth II